"The Stranger" is a 1921 short story by Katherine Mansfield. It was first published in the London Mercury in January 1921, and later reprinted in The Garden Party and Other Stories.

Plot summary
In Auckland, Mr Hammond is waiting for his wife, back from Europe. After talking to some other people waiting at the harbour, she lands in but takes her time, leading him to wonder if she was sick during the voyage - she was not.

In the hotel, Hammond says they will spend the next day sightseeing in Auckland, before going back to Napier, where they live. She then appears distant, and eventually reveals that she took a while to leave the ship because a man had died on board, and she was alone with him when that happened. The husband is put off.

Characters
Mr Scott
Mrs Scott
Jean Scott, their daughter.
Mr John Hammond
Mrs Janey Hammond, back from Europe.
Mr Gaven
Captain Johnson, the harbour master.
The dead man

Major motifs
Love
Death

Footnotes

External links
Full text
The Garden Party and Other Stories at the British Library

Modernist short stories
1921 short stories
Short stories by Katherine Mansfield
Works originally published in the London Mercury